UNF Arena is a multi-purpose arena located on the campus of the University of North Florida in Jacksonville, Florida. It is home to the North Florida Ospreys men's and women's basketball and women's volleyball teams. It is also used for other events, such as concerts and graduation ceremonies, and has served as the site of the Orlando Magic franchise's training camp. It opened in 1993 and has a capacity of up to 6,300.

In 2004 the Arena was used by the U.S. Men's and Women's Olympic teams. On September 2, 2008, the University announced plans for UNF Varsity Village. Upgrades will be on the existing locker rooms, athletics offices, scoreboard, and seating. Planned additions will include a video room, academic support area, and a hall of fame/recruiting lounge.

On March 8, 2015, the UNF Arena attendance record was set as 6,155 fans watched North Florida defeat USC Upstate in the 2015 Atlantic Sun men's basketball tournament championship game.  In the first round of the 2016 National Invitation Tournament, 6,011 fans saw the Ospreys fall to Florida, 97–68.

See also
 List of NCAA Division I basketball arenas

References

External links

UNF Arena at UNFOspreys.com

American Basketball Association (2000–present) venues
College basketball venues in the United States
Indoor arenas in Florida
Sports venues in Jacksonville, Florida
North Florida Ospreys men's basketball
Southside, Jacksonville
1993 establishments in Florida
Sports venues completed in 1993